The 1964 European Baseball Championship was held in Italy and was won by the Netherlands for the sixth time in a row. Italy finished as runner-up.

Standings

Sources 
 European Championship Archive at the sports.org

European Championship
1964
European Championship,1964
1964 in Italian sport
Sports competitions in Milan